The simple station Sevillana is part of the TransMilenio mass-transit system of Bogotá, Colombia, opened in the year 2000.

Location 

The station is located in southern Bogotá, specifically on Autopista Sur with Carrera 58, three blocks from Avenida Boyacá.

History 

This station was opened April 15, 2006 as part of the section between the stations General Santander and Portal del Sur of the NQS line.

The station is named Sevillana due to its proximity to the factory of that name that is located at the intersection of Autopista Sur with Avenida Boyacá.

The day March 9, 2012, protests lodged by mostly young children, repeatedly blocked in the trunk NQS. The protests left destroyed part of the system this season.

Station services

Old trunk services

Main line service

Feeder routes 

This station does not have connections to feeder routes.

Inter-city service 

This station does not have inter-city service.

External links 
 TransMilenio
  Opening of the line from eltiempo.com
  Problemas en la inauguración de la troncal Autopista Sur en eltiempo.com

See also 
 Bogotá
 TransMilenio
 List of TransMilenio stations

TransMilenio